Euchromius mythus is a species of moth in the family Crambidae. It occurs in most of eastern and southern Africa, including Kenya, Tanzania, Zaire, Malawi, the Comoros, Madagascar, Zimbabwe, Namibia and South Africa. The habitat consists of moist and dry savanna and woodland areas, up to an altitude of 1,000 meters.

The length of the forewings is 13–22 mm. The groundcolour of the forewings is white to creamy white, densely suffused with ochreous to dark brown scales. The hindwings are creamy white to grey with a darkly bordered termen. Adults are on wing in March, April and May in most of the range, but also in June (in Tanzania), July (on Madagascar), August (on the Comoros) and September (in Zaire).

References

Crambinae
Moths of the Comoros
Lepidoptera of the Democratic Republic of the Congo
Lepidoptera of Kenya
Lepidoptera of Malawi
Lepidoptera of Mozambique
Lepidoptera of Namibia
Lepidoptera of South Africa
Lepidoptera of Tanzania
Lepidoptera of Zambia
Lepidoptera of Zimbabwe
Moths of Madagascar
Moths of Sub-Saharan Africa
Moths described in 1970